This partial list of city nicknames in New Mexico compiles the aliases, sobriquets and slogans that cities in New Mexico are known by (or have been known by historically), officially and unofficially, to municipal governments, local people, outsiders or their tourism boards or chambers of commerce. City nicknames can help in establishing a civic identity, helping outsiders recognize a community or attracting people to a community because of its nickname; promote civic pride; and build community unity. Nicknames and slogans that successfully create a new community "ideology or myth" are also believed to have economic value. Their economic value is difficult to measure, but there are anecdotal reports of cities that have achieved substantial economic benefits by "branding" themselves by adopting new slogans.

Some unofficial nicknames are positive, while others are derisive. The unofficial nicknames listed here have been in use for a long time or have gained wide currency.
Albuquerque
BurqueLeslie Linthicum, Albuquerque Journal - "Here's a Q-tip - ¡Viva Burque!", January 8, 2009
The Duke City
The Q Reuse in the Q
Anthony – Leap Year Capital of the World (shared with Anthony, Texas)
Carlsbad – Cavern City
Cloudcroft - A Pasture for the Clouds
Farmington – F Easy
Gallup – Native American Capital of the WorldTagline Guru City Branding Survey , Tagline Guru website, accessed Aug 18, 2009
Hatch – Chile Pepper Capital of the World
Las Cruces
The City of the Garden of Crosses
Stinktown
Las Vegas – Meadow City
Los Alamos – Atomic City
Rio Rancho – City of Vision
Rodeo – New Mexico's most western town
Roswell
 Alien Capital of the WorldAliens: a conspiracy out of this world , BBC News, 2 October 1998
 The Aliens Aren't the Only Reason to Visit
Santa Fe – The City DifferentSanta Fe, New Mexico , accessed April 5, 2007. "Nestled at 7000 feet in the foothills of the Rocky Mountains, Santa Fe, New Mexico, the "City Different", is America's oldest capital city and claims a long history and rich cultural heritage."
Santa Rosa – The Scuba Capital of the Southwest
Taos – Soul of the Southwest

See also 
 List of city nicknames in the United States

References

New Mexico cities and towns
Populated places in New Mexico
City nicknames